Claudio Andrés Meneses Cordero (born 5 February 1988) is a Chilean footballer that currently plays for San Luis de Quillota as a defender.

Career

O'Higgins
In 2012, Meneses was runner-up with O'Higgins, after lose the final against Universidad de Chile in the penalty shoot-out.

In 2013, he won the Apertura 2013-14 with O'Higgins. In the tournament, he played in 11 of 18 matches.

Honours

Club
O'Higgins
 Primera División: 2013–A

Individual
O'Higgins
Medalla Santa Cruz de Triana: 2014

References

External links
 Claudio Meneses at Football-Lineups
 
 

1988 births
Living people
People from La Serena
Chilean footballers
Chilean expatriate footballers
Chilean Primera División players
Malaysia Super League players
Primera B de Chile players
Deportes La Serena footballers
O'Higgins F.C. footballers
Audax Italiano footballers
San Luis de Quillota footballers
Sri Pahang FC players
A.C. Barnechea footballers
Unión La Calera footballers
Chilean expatriate sportspeople in Malaysia
Expatriate footballers in Malaysia
Association football defenders